Moselle is a census-designated place and unincorporated community in southern Jones County, Mississippi.  The community is part of the Laurel micropolitan area.

History
Moselle has a post office, with the ZIP code 39459.

Moselle is located on the Norfolk Southern Railway and was incorporated on December 14, 1905. It was unincorporated at an unknown date.

It was first named as a CDP in the 2020 Census which listed a population of 304.

Geography
Moselle is located along U.S. Route 11, north of Eastabuchie and southwest of Laurel.  The Leaf River, as well as the Hattiesburg-Laurel Regional Airport, are located west of Moselle.

Demographics

2020 census

Note: the US Census treats Hispanic/Latino as an ethnic category. This table excludes Latinos from the racial categories and assigns them to a separate category. Hispanics/Latinos can be of any race.

Education
Public education in Moselle is provided by the Jones County School District. Campuses serving the community include Moselle Elementary School, a K-6 school located in Moselle, and South Jones High School, located in Ellisville.

Notable people
 Thermon Blacklidge, former member of the National Basketball League
 Jack Nix, former National Football League wing back
 Ronnie Shows, U.S Representative from Mississippi.
 Roy M. Wheat, posthumously awarded the Medal of Honor for his actions in the Vietnam War.

References

Unincorporated communities in Jones County, Mississippi
Unincorporated communities in Mississippi
Census-designated places in Jones County, Mississippi
Laurel micropolitan area
U.S. Route 11